Daylight Records was an American record label and subsidiary of Sony Music Entertainment, operated through Epic Records.

History 
Daylight was formed by David Massey in late 1998 as an Epic Records Group label, and has subsequently signed and helped to develop a broad array of artists, in the process achieving global sales in excess of 30 million records. Daylight also served as an A&R resource for all the labels within the Sony Music Label Group family, including Columbia Records Group, Epic Records and RED Distribution.

Artists
Anastacia
Cyndi Lauper
Good Charlotte
Jonas Brothers
Phantom Planet 
Cheyenne Kimball

See also 
 List of record labels

External links 
 
 Epic Records

American record labels
Epic Records
Pop record labels
Record labels established in 1998
Record labels disestablished in 2009
Sony Music